Frédéric Dufour (born 2 February 1976 in Lyon) is a French rower.

References

External links 
 
 

1976 births
Living people
French male rowers
Sportspeople from Lyon
Olympic rowers of France
Rowers at the 2004 Summer Olympics
Rowers at the 2008 Summer Olympics
Olympic silver medalists for France
Olympic medalists in rowing
Medalists at the 2004 Summer Olympics
World Rowing Championships medalists for France
Mediterranean Games silver medalists for France
Mediterranean Games medalists in rowing
Competitors at the 2005 Mediterranean Games
20th-century French people
21st-century French people